Pac's Life is the tenth and final studio album by American rapper 2Pac. It is also his seventh posthumous album, released on November 21, 2006, in the United States, on Amaru Entertainment. Its 2006 release date was intended to commemorate the tenth anniversary of his murder. The album debuted at number nine on the US Billboard 200 chart.

Background
A broad range of artists contributed to the album, including Outlawz, Krayzie Bone, Snoop Dogg, Chamillionaire, Ludacris, A-3, Big Syke, Papoose, Keyshia Cole, Jay Rock, Young Buck, Ashanti, T.I., Lil' Scrappy, Nipsey Hussle, three posthumous appearances by Kadafi, and Jamal Woolard, who became famous for portraying The Notorious B.I.G. in the 2009 biopic Notorious and in the 2017 biopic All Eyez on Me. 14 out of the 15 tracks were remixed posthumously with "Soon As I Get Home" being the only track left un-altered from the way 2Pac recorded it.

The album features guest appearances from Ashanti and T.I., who appear on the title track "Pac's Life." They also participated in the release of the single version of the song, which was filmed at the Tupac Amaru Shakur Center for the Arts. The World Premiere of "Pac's Life" was on at 7:30 PM on BET's Access Granted on Wednesday, November 22. The video featured on BET's behind the scenes of the filming of "Pac's Life". Krayzie Bone, appears on the album's first single, "Untouchable".

Promotion
The album was recorded in Van Nuys, California. A week of events was conducted for the celebration of the release. It kicked off on Saturday November 11 at the Vaknin Gallery with "All Eyez On Me: Hip-Hop's Legendary Performers and Photographers," where photographers displayed their material. On Tuesday November 14, at the same venue, a VIP party previewing Pac's Life took place from 7:00pm – 10:00pm. The events were then shifted to the Tupac Amaru Shakur Center for the Arts (TASCA) where coat drives were held on Wednesday, November 15 and Friday, November 17 everyone who brought a winter coat received two admission tickets to the Pac's Life album release party. On Monday November 20, a "Pac's Life Teen Art" competition took place from 6-8 PM, where children ages 13–17 competed in an art exhibit contest.

Critical reception

Reviews from critics and fans were mixed, with the general consensus being that while 2Pac's vocals were undoubtedly strong, the modern production sounded commercialized. AllMusic wrote: "This isn't to say that there is not some great material on Pac's Life, because there is ..., but the power of 2Pac's words is often lost behind the modern production ... and new verses from artists like Ludacris, Lil Scrappy, Ashanti, and Young Buck."

Commercial performance
Pac's Life debuted at number nine on the US Billboard 200 chart, selling 159,000 copies in its first week. This became 2Pac's tenth US top-ten album and his seventh posthumous album to reach the top-ten.

Track listing

Charts

Weekly charts

Year-end charts

Release history

References

2006 albums
Albums produced by E.D.I.
Albums produced by Swizz Beatz
Interscope Records albums
Albums published posthumously
Tupac Shakur albums
Albums produced by L.T. Hutton